Noel's Christmas Presents is a British television show hosted by Noel Edmonds that was originally broadcast on Christmas Day on BBC1 from 1989 to 1999 (except 1992) and then on Sky 1 from 23 December 2007 to 23 December 2012, where special Christmas presents were delivered to well-deserving members of the public. Edmonds did not host the final edition in 2012, which was renamed All-Star Christmas Presents and presented by Sally Lindsay.

Transmissions

BBC1

Sky 1

References

1990s British television series
2000s British television series
1986 British television series debuts
2012 British television series endings
BBC Television shows
Sky UK original programming
Television series by ITV Studios
English-language television shows